Cansu Özdemir (born 8 September 1988) is a German politician of The Left from Hamburg. She is a member of the Hamburg Parliament.

Life 
Özdemir was born in Hamburg to Kurdish parents in 1988. After she received her Abitur from Kieler Straße Business School in 2009, she studied cultural anthropology and politics at the University of Hamburg.

Political career 
In 2009, Özdemir also became a member of The Left and in 2011 she entered the Hamburg Parliament of which she has been a member ever since.  Özdemir led The Left in the 2020 Hamburg state election.

She is known for her support for the legalization of the Kurdistan Workers' Party, which is banned in Germany. Özdemir is also a strong critic of the Turkish president Recep Tayyip Erdoğan, and the foreign policy of Germany regarding Turkey. She called Recep Tayyip Erdoğan a "dictator" in an interview., and is also critical of the Syrian civil war.

She is running for Bundestag in the 2021 German federal election. She is standing in the constituency of Hamburg-Altona.

References

External links 
 Biography at the Hamburg Parliament website

1988 births
Living people
Politicians from Hamburg
German people of Kurdish descent
21st-century German women politicians
Women members of State Parliaments in Germany
The Left (Germany) politicians
University of Hamburg alumni
Members of the Hamburg Parliament